The following is a timeline of the history of the city of Bukavu, Democratic Republic of the Congo.

20th century

 1924 - Bukavu becomes part of the newly formed administrative Province Orientale in colonial Belgian Congo.(fr)
 1925 - Seat of Kivu District relocated to Bukavu from Rutshuru.
 1927 - Bukavu renamed "Costermansville" after Belgian colonial official Paul Costermans.
 1929 - Catholic Apostolic Vicariate of Kivu established.
 1927 - Zoological and Forest Reserve of Mount Kahuzi established near Costermansville.
 1938 -  founded by Catholic Pères Blancs.
 1942 - Catholic, Swahili-French language Hodi newspaper begins publication.
 1951
 Catholic Our Lady of Peace Cathedral built.
 Bushi Football Club founded.
 1953
 Costermansville renamed "Bukavu."
 La Presse Africaine newspaper begins publication.
 1958 - Bukavu attains city status.
 1961
 Denis Maganga Igomokelo becomes mayor.
  (school) established.
 1967 - 9 August: City taken by rebel Katangan forces. 
 1970 - Kahuzi-Biéga National Park established near city.
 1975 - Population: 146,504 (estimate).
 1984 - Population: 167,950 (estimate).
 1989 - City becomes part of the newly formed South Kivu province.
 1993 -  begins broadcasting.
 1994
 Rwandan war refugees flee to Bukavu.
 Population: 201,569 (estimate).
 1996 - October: City taken by Alliance of Democratic Forces for the Liberation of Congo.
 1999 - Panzi Hospital established.
 2000 - Congolese war refugees arrive in Bagira.

21st century
 2004 - May–June: Violent conflict between rebel and national forces.
 2007 - 13 June: Journalist  killed.
 2008
 3 February: 2008 Lake Kivu earthquake.
 22 November: Mass graves found on land owned by Rally for Congolese Democracy party member.
 Zita Kavungirwa Kayange becomes mayor.
 OC Bukavu Dawa wins Coupe du Congo football contest.
 2010
 17 October: Women demonstrate "to demand an end to a wave of mass rapes."
  becomes governor of South Kivu province.
 2012 - 12 February: Airplane carrying politicians crashes in Bukavu;  killed.
 2014
 February: Political rally; crackdown.
 5 June: Prison break occurs.
 2015
 January: 2015 Congolese protests.
 August: 2015 South Kivu earthquake
 Population: 295,665 (estimate).
 Saveur du Kivu coffee event begins.
 Lusenda refugee camp begins operating in vicinity of Bukavu.
 2017
 28 July: Prison break occurs.
 August: Cholera outbreak.
2022
 2022 Bukavu floods

See also
 Bukavu history
 List of mayors of Bukavu
 Timelines of other cities in DR Congo: Goma, Kinshasa, Kisangani, Lubumbashi

References

This article incorporates information from the French Wikipedia.

Bibliography

External links

  (Bibliography)
  (Bibliography)
  (Bibliography)
  (Bibliography)
  (Bibliography)
 Items related to Bukavu, various dates (via Europeana)
 Items related to Bukavu, various dates (via Digital Public Library of America)

Images

Bukavu
Bukavu
History of the Democratic Republic of the Congo
Democratic Republic of the Congo history-related lists
Years in the Democratic Republic of the Congo